Du Qinglin (born November 1946 in Panshi, Jilin City, Jilin) is a politician of the People's Republic of China. He formerly serves as vice chairman of Chinese People's Political Consultative Conference (CPPCC), and a Secretary of the Secretariat of the Chinese Communist Party (CCP). From 2007 and 2012 he served as the director of United Front Work Department of CCP.

Du graduated from law department of Jilin University with a master's degree. He joined the CCP in March 1966. 

In early years, Du served in FAW Car Co., Ltd in Changchun and Communist Youth League Jilin committee. From September 1984 to 1991, he served as vice secretary of CCP Changchun municipal committee, a standing committee member of CCP Jilin committee, director of organization department in Jilin, and vice secretary of CCP Jilin committee. In March 1992, Du became the vice secretary of CCP Hainan committee. He was elected the chairman of Hainan People's Congress in February 1993. From February 1998 to August 2001, Du was the secretary of CCP Hainan committee. From August 2001 to December 2006, Du served as Minister of Agriculture. In December 2006, he became the secretary of CCP Sichuan committee, and was elected chairman of Sichuan People's Congress in January 2007. In December 2007, Du succeeded Liu Yandong as the director of United Front Work Department of CCP. 

On March 13, 2008, Du was elected vice chairman of CPPCC. In November 2012, he was elected to the Secretariat of the Chinese Communist Party, while continuing his term as Vice Chairman of the CPPCC.

Du was a member of 15th, 16th, and 17th Central Committee of the Chinese Communist Party. He is a current member of the 18th Central Committee of the Chinese Communist Party.

References

1946 births
Living people
People from Jilin City
People's Republic of China politicians from Jilin
Jilin University alumni
Political office-holders in Jilin
Political office-holders in Hainan
Members of the Secretariat of the Chinese Communist Party
Ministers of Agriculture of the People's Republic of China
Vice Chairpersons of the National Committee of the Chinese People's Political Consultative Conference